Brendon Claude Adams (born 10 March 1984) is a South African former cricketer.

References
Brendon Adams profile at CricketArchive

1984 births
Living people
Cricketers from Paarl
South African cricketers
Gauteng cricketers
Boland cricketers